Kayla Cross (born 21 March 2005) is a Canadian tennis player.

Cross has a career-high singles ranking by the WTA of 631, achieved on 27 February 2023. She also has a career-high WTA doubles ranking of 392, achieved on the same date.

Cross made her WTA Tour main-draw debut at the 2022 National Bank Open in the doubles draw, partnering Victoria Mboko.

She reached the finals of two Grand Slam junior tournaments in 2022, losing in the finals of the doubles competitions at the Australian Open and at Wimbledon.

ITF Circuit finals

Doubles: 3 (1 title, 2 runner-ups)

References

External links
 
 

2005 births
Living people
Canadian female tennis players
Racket sportspeople from Ontario